The 2016 Africa Futsal Cup of Nations was the 5th edition of the Africa Futsal Cup of Nations, the quadrennial international futsal championship organised by the Confederation of African Football (CAF) for the men's national teams of Africa. The tournament was held in South Africa between 15–24 April 2016. A total of eight teams played in the tournament.

Same as previous editions, the tournament acted as the CAF qualifiers for the FIFA Futsal World Cup (except for 2012 when a separate qualifying tournament was organized as the 2011 African Futsal Championship was cancelled). The top three teams of the tournament qualified for the 2016 FIFA Futsal World Cup in Colombia as the CAF representatives.

On 6 August 2015, the CAF Executive Committee decided to change the name of the tournament from the African Futsal Championship to the Africa Futsal Cup of Nations, similar to the football version, Africa Cup of Nations.

Champions Morocco, runners-up Egypt and third-placed Mozambique qualified for the 2016 FIFA Futsal World Cup as the CAF representatives.

Qualification

South Africa qualified automatically as hosts, and Egypt also qualified automatically as the highest-placed African team in the 2012 FIFA Futsal World Cup, while the remaining six spots were determined by the qualifying rounds, which took take place in December 2015.

Qualified teams
The following eight teams qualified for the final tournament.

Venues
The matches were played at the Ellis Park Arena and the Wembley Indoor Stadium in Johannesburg.

Squads

Each squad could contain a maximum of 14 players.

Group stage
The draw for the final tournament of the competition took place on 17 February 2016, 11:00 UTC+2, at the Southern Sun Hotel OR Tambo International Airport in Johannesburg. The eight teams were drawn into two groups of four. For the draw, the hosts South Africa were seeded in position A1 and Egypt were seeded in position B1. The remaining six teams were drawn from one pot to fill the other positions in the two groups.

The top two teams of each group advanced to the semi-finals.

Tiebreakers
The teams were ranked according to points (3 points for a win, 1 point for a draw, 0 points for a loss). If tied on points, tiebreakers would be applied in the following order:
Number of points obtained in games between the teams concerned;
Goal difference in games between the teams concerned;
Goals scored in games between the teams concerned;
If, after applying criteria 1 to 3 to several teams, two teams still have an equal ranking, criteria 1 to 3 are reapplied exclusively to the matches between the two teams in question to determine their final rankings. If this procedure does not lead to a decision, criteria 5 to 7 apply;
Goal difference in all games;
Goals scored in all games;
Drawing of lots.

All times were local, SAST (UTC+2).

Group A

Group B

Knockout stage
In the knockout stage, if a match was level at the end of normal playing time, extra time would be played (two periods of 5 minutes each) and followed, if necessary, by kicks from the penalty mark to determine the winner, except for the third place match where no extra time would be played.

Bracket

Semi-finals
Winners qualified for 2016 FIFA Futsal World Cup.

Third place play-off
Winner qualified for 2016 FIFA Futsal World Cup.

Final

Winners

Tournament ranking
The three best ranked teams qualified for the 2016 FIFA Futsal World Cup.

Qualified teams for FIFA Futsal World Cup
The following three teams from CAF qualified for the FIFA Futsal World Cup.

1 Bold indicates champion for that year. Italic indicates host for that year.

References

External links
Futsal Africa Cup Of Nations, South Africa 2016, CAFonline.com

2016
International futsal competitions hosted by South Africa
Sports competitions in Johannesburg
Caf
2016 in futsal
Futsal
2016 in South African sport
April 2016 sports events in Africa